Clifford Case,  (July 17, 1897 – December 30, 1940) was a lawyer and political figure in Ontario, Canada. He represented York North in the Legislative Assembly of Ontario from 1929 to 1934 as a Conservative member.

Background
Case was born on a farm in King township to parents George Case and Annie Morning. He was educated in Aurora and at Osgoode Hall, graduating in 1924. In 1923 he married Mary Dunbar and together they raised three sons. Case practised law in Aurora and Toronto and was named King's Counsel in 1929. Case died in York County Hospital at the age of 43.

Politics
Case served as deputy reeve of Aurora in 1928. In 1929 he ran as the Conservative candidate in the riding of York North. He defeated Liberal incumbent Peter Pearson by 198 votes. He was defeated by Liberal candidate Morgan Baker in the next election.

References

External links

1897 births
1940 deaths
People from Aurora, Ontario
Progressive Conservative Party of Ontario MPPs
Canadian King's Counsel